Richard Bartoš (born 28 June 1992) is a Slovak professional footballer who plays for MFK Tatran Liptovský Mikuláš.

References

Club career

MFK Ružomberok
He made his debut for Ružomberok against Slovan Bratislava on 1 September 2012.

External links
 MFK Tatran Liptovský Mikuláš official club profile 
 
 Futbalnet profile 
 

1992 births
Living people
Slovak footballers
Slovakia youth international footballers
Association football midfielders
MFK Ružomberok players
MFK Dolný Kubín players
ŠKF Sereď players
MFK Tatran Liptovský Mikuláš players
2. Liga (Slovakia) players
Slovak Super Liga players